Kaundinya II, was a ruler from the house of Kaudinya, Varman dynasty of the Phnom or Funan kingdom.

Biography 
He was the son of King Candana, who was descented from King Kaundinya I. During his reign about 410 AD, he married to Queen Kulaprabhavati. The son born to her was Kaundinyajayavarman (Khmer: ព្រះបទកៅណ្ឌិន្យជ័យវរ្ម័ន, Latin: Kaundinya jayavarman) and died in 434 AD.

References

6th-century Cambodian monarchs
Funan